Canal Maximo Televisión (CMT) was a Venezuelan free-to-air television network that was seen on UHF channel 51 in the metropolitan area of Caracas, Barquisimeto, and the Miranda State, channel 43 in Calabozo, Puerto Ordaz, and the Zulia State, and channel 21 in San Cristóbal.

History
In 1993, Umberto Petricca Zugaro founded Canal Metropolitano Televisión (CMT) and received government authorization to begin its testing phase. It was one of the first television stations to broadcast on an ultra high frequency (UHF) channel in Venezuela. Their studios were located in the Caracas neighborhood of Los Cortijos de Lourdes.

In their first year, CMT was on the air five hours a day (6:00 pm to 11:00 pm) and reached 75% of the city of Caracas from a transmitter located in the neighborhood of Colinas de los Caobos.

In 1995, CMT began broadcasting 18 hours a day and moved to their studios in Boleíta Norte.

In 1999, Canal Metropolitano Televisión changed its name to Canal Maximo Televisión, but kept the CMT branding.

In 2000, CMT inaugurated a powerful satellite teleport, enabling it to send its signal to other areas of the country.

In 2001, CMT increased their reach by way of a satellite.  Their signal began to arrive in San Cristóbal (channel 21), Barinas (under the name Telellanos), Calabozo, Puerto Ordaz, and on small cable companies.

CMT received the broadcasting rights for Miss Global Venezuela 2006 and Miss Global International 2006; however, on December 11, 2006, the installations of this channel were purchased by the Venezuelan government so that teleSUR could broadcast over the air in parts of the country.
CMT did not possess a wide network, nor a high quality of broadcasting, and since it is such a small channel when compared to other media outlets in the country, it wasn't included in the channel roster of the vast majority of cable TV providers. They also lacked a website, since the domain CMT was put on sale a while back.

Criticism
CMT, as well as other television networks in Venezuela, was accused of participating in the coup d'état against President Hugo Chávez.

Programming

List of programs formerly broadcast by CMT

Variety
Mujeres y Algo Más (co-hosted by Mariana Carles, who also worked as a news presenter on the evening edition of El Observador at the national television network, Radio Caracas Televisión) 
Sabor a Chef 
Cocina Internacional 
Alquimia del Chef 
Tae-Tek 
Conectate con Tu Cuerpo 
Pasaje al Mas Allá
Viendo lo Invisible 
Tempe Cume
Arquitecto de los Sueños
Techo Propio 
Construcción Inmobiliaria 
Lo Mejor de Venezuela 
Viajeros 
Querencias Venezolanas 
Punto Cero 
Mundo Latino
Vuelo en Parapente 
El Mágico Mundo del Cine 
Vacilatexto 
Grandes Musicales 
Fandango 
Destino X 
Sabor Tropical 
Moda Más Moda 
Versión Real 
María Elvira Confronta 
Medicina en Capsula 
Revista Medica 
Por Su Seguridad 
2 Minutos

Children's Programming
Que Tal Chamo 
Hermanos

Sports
Grand Slam 
Perfil Deportivo 
Basket Report 
Rugen Los Motores 
CMT Deportes 
Futbol Report 
Mundiales del Futbol 
Conexión Con el Beisbol 
Magazine Hípico 
Favoritos de Cabalgata Hípica

Information
CMT Noticias  (two daily editions)

Opinion
Visión Informativa con Italo Luongo 
Compas Internacional 
Teodoro Que Dice? (hosted by Teodoro Petkoff, ex-presidential candidate)

Evolution of the CMT logo

See also
List of Venezuelan television channels
List of local television stations in South America
List of Spanish-language television channels
List of South American television stations

References

External links
Official Site 
Information on Dr. Umberto Petricca Zugaro and the Grupo U.P. Constructora Pedeca, C.A.

Defunct television channels and networks in Venezuela
Television channels and stations established in 1993
Television channels and stations disestablished in 2006
1993 establishments in Venezuela
2006 disestablishments in Venezuela